Generation Kill follows the Marines of the 1st Recon Battalion through the first four weeks of the 2003 invasion of Iraq. The characters are drawn from this group of Marines.

The recurring characters are part of the 1st Marine Division. The division is under the command of Major General James "Maddog" Mattis, played by Robert Burke. His callsign is "Chaos".

1st Marine Regiment

1st Recon Battalion
Nearly all of the recurring characters are members of 1st Reconnaissance Battalion (1st Recon), commanded by Lieutenant Colonel Stephen "Godfather" Ferrando (played by Chance Kelly). His command staff include Major Todd Eckloff played by Benjamin Busch and Sergeant Major John Sixta, played by Neal Jones. Nabil Elouahabi plays the battalion's translator, "Meesh." The battalion surgeon, Lieutenant Alex Aubin (Andrew Spicer) also appears.

Alpha Company
Alpha Company is commanded by Captain Bryan Patterson played by Michael Kelly. The company callsign is "Assassin".

Bravo Company
Bravo Company is commanded by Captain Craig Schwetje played by Brian Wade. The company callsign is "Hitman". Schwetje is nicknamed "Encino Man" when out of earshot, a reference to the titular character from the film of the same name. This is meant to invoke stupidity and incompetence.

2nd Platoon

3rd Platoon

Charlie Company
1st Recon Battalion's third rifle company. Members are featured in a short scene in Episode 4: "Combat Jack", but no Marines are specifically named. The company commander's call sign is "Raptor".

Delta Company

Company of USMC reservists attached to 1st Recon Battalion.  Members are featured in Episode 6: "Stay Frosty", but only one Staff Non-commissioned officer who has an acquaintance with 2nd platoon of Bravo Company is named.

References
 
 

Generation Kill
Generation Kill
Generation Kill